The D platform is a front wheel drive automobile platform for mid-size cars from Nissan. It is slightly smaller than Nissan FF-L platform.

Models
 2007+ Renault Laguna III
 2007+ Nissan Murano (Z51)
 2008+ Nissan Maxima (A35)
 2008+ Nissan Teana (J32)/Nissan Maxima (Australia/New Zealand) (J32)
 2009+ Renault Samsung SM5 (L43)
 2010+ Renault Latitude
 2010+ Nissan Elgrand
 2010+ Nissan Quest
 2011+ Renault Samsung New SM7 (L47)
 2012+ Nissan Altima (L33 and L34)
2013+ Nissan Teana (L33)
 2013+ Infiniti JX35/Infiniti QX60 (L50)
 2013+ Nissan Pathfinder (R52)
 2015+ Nissan Murano (Z52)
 2015+ Nissan Maxima (A36)
 2016+ Venucia T90

References 

D
D